Solo is a 1980 Soviet drama film directed by Konstantin Lopushansky.

Plot 
The film takes place in the besieged Leningrad in the winter of 1942. The film tells about the soloist of the symphony orchestra, which is preparing for a concert to be held at the Leningrad Philharmonic and broadcast in London.

Cast 
 Nikolai Grinko as Aleksandr Mihaylovich
 Lyudmila Arzhannikova
 Valentina Smirnova	
 Viktor Gogolev
 Nora Gryakalova
 Kirill Gun		
 Gelena Ivlieva as Housekeeper
 Yuri Radionov as Sergey
 Svetlana Smirnova as Pregnant woman in a bath
 Olga Volkova

References

External links 
 

1980 films
1980s Russian-language films
Soviet drama films
1980 drama films